Hannah White Arnett (1733–1823) was an American woman who is known for preventing a group of men in Elizabethtown, Province of New Jersey (now Elizabeth) from proclaiming their loyalty to Great Britain in exchange for "protection of life and property." When she heard the men, who were meeting in her house, talking about this offer, she called them cowards and traitors. Although Isaac, her husband, tried to get her out of the room, she continued to harangue the men and stated that she would leave her husband if he did not continue to support the American Revolution. The men eventually refused the offer.

In 1876 this account of Hannah White Arnett was first told, in the New York Observer in a piece by Henrietta Holdich.

On July 13, 1890, after the Sons of the American Revolution refused to allow women to join their group, Mary Smith Lockwood published the story of Hannah White Arnett in the Washington Post, ending her piece with the question, "Where will the Sons and Daughters of the American Revolution place Hannah Arnett?"  On July 21 of that year, William O. McDowell, a great-grandson of Hannah White Arnett, published an article in The Washington Post offering to help form a society to be known as the Daughters of the American Revolution. The first meeting of the society was held August 9, 1890.

A memorial "honoring the patriotic dead of many wars laid to rest in this hallowed ground especially a noble woman Hannah White Arnett" was erected in 1938 in the cemetery of the First Presbyterian Church, Elizabeth, New Jersey, by the Boudinot Chapter of the Daughters of the American Revolution. This is the cemetery where Arnett was buried. Another marker on the wall of that cemetery, which is now illegible, read in part, "Near here rests Hannah White Arnett…Her patriotic words, uttered in the dark days of 1776, summoned discouraged men to keep Elizabethtown loyal to the cause of American independence."

The Hannah White Arnett Chapter of the Daughters of the American Revolution was named after her; it is a Fort Payne, Alabama chapter.

References

People from Elizabeth, New Jersey
1733 births
1823 deaths
People of colonial New Jersey
Women in the American Revolution
Burials in New Jersey
People of New Jersey in the American Revolution